is a 2016 Japanese drama film directed by Wayne Wang. It was shown in the Panorama section at the 66th Berlin International Film Festival.

Cast
 Takeshi Kitano
 Hidetoshi Nishijima
 Sayuri Oyamada
 Shioli Kutsuna
 Hirofumi Arai
 Makiko Watanabe

References

External links
 

2016 films
2016 drama films
Japanese drama films
2010s Japanese-language films
Films directed by Wayne Wang
2010s Japanese films